is a passenger railway station  located in the city of Sanda, Hyōgo Prefecture, Japan. It is operated by the private transportation company, Kobe Electric Railway (Shintetsu).

Lines

Station layout
The station consists of one elevated island platform serving two tracks, with the station building underneath. The effective length of the platform is five cars, but normally only three-car trains are operated. The station is unattended.

Platforms

History
The station was opened on March 28, 1996.

Passenger statistics
In fiscal 2019, the station was used by an average of 1869 passengers daily

Surrounding area
The station is part of the Kobe-Sanda International Park City, with the surrounding area mostly residential. 
Hyogo Prefectural Road No. 720 Techno Park Mita Line

See also
List of railway stations in Japan

References

External links 

 Official home page 

Railway stations in Hyōgo Prefecture
Railway stations in Japan opened in 1996
Sanda, Hyōgo